Mayoral may refer to:

 Mayoral is an adjectival form of mayor
 Mayoral, a Spanish Children's Fashion Company
 Borja Mayoral (born 1997), Spanish footballer
 César Mayoral (born 1947), Argentine diplomat
 David Mayoral (born 1997), Spanish footballer
 Jordi Mayoral (born 1973), Spanish sprinter
 Juan Eugenio Hernández Mayoral (born 1969), Puerto Rican politician
 Lila Mayoral Wirshing (1942-2003), First Lady of Puerto Rico
 Mayoral Gallery, Barcelona

See also
 Mayor (disambiguation)
 Mayor (surname)
 Mayoral Academies, publicly funded charter schools in the state of Rhode Island
 

Spanish-language surnames